Guadaíra is a railway interchange station between Seville Metro and commuter train services of Seville, Andalusia. It is located at the outskirts of the city, close to Utrera road. Guadaíra is an elevated station of line 1 of the metro and the C-4 circular line of the suburban trains.

See also
 List of Seville metro stations

References

External links 
  Official site.
 History, construction details and maps.

Seville Metro stations
Railway stations in Andalusia